Rereao Tetaake Eria is a former I-Kiribati politician. Succeedin her husband
Mr Tetaake Eria, she served as a member of parliament for Teraina in the ninth and tenth Parliaments of Kiribati. She represented the Pillars of Truth (Boutokan Te Koaua) party. In the 2015–16 Kiribati parliamentary election, she lost her seat to Uriam Iabeta.

References

Living people
21st-century I-Kiribati women politicians
Members of the House of Assembly (Kiribati)
Year of birth unknown
Pillars of Truth politicians
People from the Line Islands (Kiribati)
21st-century I-Kiribati politicians
Year of birth missing (living people)